Andrzej Szczytko (9 October 1955 – 11 June 2021) was a Polish actor and stage director. Szczytko is the recipient of multiple theatre awards and honours, including the 2016 Witkacy Prize - Critics' Circle Award. He was awarded the Decoration of Honor "Meritorious for Polish Culture" in 2012 for his contribution to Polish culture, and in 2017, the Silver Medal for Merit to Culture – Gloria Artis.

Career 

Graduate of National Film School in Łódź (1978), where he studied alongside Jacek Koman. Szczytko was also trained at DePaul University's Goodman School of Drama (1980). He made his first professional stage appearance in 1977 as a Lentulus in a production of Androcles and the Lion directed by the reformer of Polish mime theatre, Henryk Tomaszewski.

Szczytko has had a prolific career in theatre, particularly repertory theatre, in Poland and Eastern Europe. He was a permanent troupe member of the Cyprian Norwid Theatre in Jelenia Góra (1977–78), the Aleksander Węgierko Theatre in Białystok (1978–1980), the Contemporary Theatre in Szczecin (1980), the Polish Theatre in Szczecin (1981–83), the Leon Kruczkowski Theater in Zielona Góra (1993–95), the Polish Theatre in Poznań (1983–2000), the Music Theatre in Poznań (2007–2008), the New Theatre in Łódź (2009–2012).

From 1991 to 1993 Szczytko was an artistic director of the Polish Institute of Theatre Arts in New York City. Between 1998 and 2000 he worked for Polish Theatre in Poznań as an associate intendant, as well as acting general intendant in 2000. From 2012 to 2017 he served as a guest director in the Kharkiv Ukrainian Drama Theatre, where his productions gained the reputation of political theatre.

He collaborated with some of the most renowned theatre directors, all of whom would have a huge impact on Szczytko's future career. Among them were Krystian Lupa (as Mandelabum in Witkacy's Dainty Shapes and Hairy Apes, or The Green Pill), Alina Obidniak (as Orestes in Johann Wolfgang von Goethe's Iphigenia in Tauris), Wanda Laskowska (as Doctor in James Joyce's Ulysses), Lech Raczak (as Titorelli in Franz Kafka's The Trial), Jerzy Kreczmar (as German in August Strindberg's Master Olof), Roman Kłosowski (as Joe in William Saroyan's The Time of Your Life) and Krzysztof Babicki (as Gottlieb Biedermann in Max Frisch's The Fire Raisers).

He continued to act in theatre for most of his career, and became noted for his portrayal of Bruce Niles in Larry Kramer's play The Normal Heart, but became better known once he started to work with movie directors Zbigniew Kuźmiński, Andrzej Konic and Adek Drabiński. He later acted, with acclaim, in their movies and miniseries, including Republic of Hope (1988) opposite Barbara Brylska and Leon Niemczyk, The Burning Border (1988–1991), Sensations of the 20th Century (2001–2005), and Mystery of the Codes Stronghold (2007).

Filmography (selected) 

 Mother Courage and Her Children (TVP 1, 1983) – Sergeant
Republic of Ostrów (TVP 1, 1986) – Feliks Krogulecki
 Republic of Hope (1988) – Feliks Krogulecki
 The Burning Border (TVP 1, 1988−1991) – Lieutenant Lenart
 The Normal Heart (TVP 1, 1989) – Bruce Niles
 Poznań '56 (1996) – Surgeon
 With Fire and Sword (1999) – Otaman
 Teachers (Polsat, 2000−2001) – Zbigniew Szawdzianiec, chemistry teacher
 For better and for worse (TVP 2, 2001−2004) – Doctor Biernacki
 Gloria Victoribus! (TVP 1, 2003) – Colonel Bohdan Hulewicz
 The Mysterious Castle (TVP 1, 2004) – Commander Howard Campaigne from TICOM
 The Venlo Incident (TVP 1, 2004) – Bert Sas
 The Red Orchestra (TVP 1, 2005) – an Oberst of Abwehr
 The Wave of Crimes (Polsat, 2006) – Zygmunt Rokicki, Vice-Minister of Finance
 The File (2007) – Włodzimierz Ostrowski
 Mystery of the Codes Stronghold (TVP 1, 2007) – Captain Thomas Gregg
 Father Matthew (TVP 1, 2009−2011) – Rector
 True Law (TVN, 2014) – Military Judge
 Our Century (TVP 1, 2019) – President Ignacy Mościcki

See also
Polish cinema
List of Polish actors and actresses

References

External links 

1955 births
2021 deaths
Łódź Film School alumni
Actors from Poznań
Polish theatre directors
Polish male film actors
Theatre managers and producers
Recipients of the Decoration of Honor Meritorious for Polish Culture
Recipients of the Silver Medal for Merit to Culture – Gloria Artis
People from Augustów